Jai Mata Di is a 1977 Punjabi devotional film. It was directed by Daljit .

Cast
Dara Singh as Balbir
Narendra Chanchal
Babu Sonu
Sardar Akhter
Satyajeet Puri
Master Vishal
Mumtaz Begum
Madhumati
Kamini
Tun Tun
Sajid
 Gulshan Kumar Mehta
Mirza Mushauff
Polsan
Saudagar Singh
Jugnu
Kamaljeet Sona

Music
Music by Hansraj Behl
Playback Singer - Aasha Bhonsle, Mahendra Kapoor, Minu Purshotum, Dilraj Kaur, S. Balbeer, Hira Lala & Narendra Chanchal

References

External links 
 

1977 films
1970s Punjabi-language films